Vytautas Budriūnas (Americanized his name as Walter "Whitey" Budrun; born December 19, 1908; died June 28, 2003) was a Lithuanian basketball player. He won gold medal at EuroBasket 1939 with Lithuania national basketball team. He was notable for his one-handed jumpshot (he used it because of a left arm that never straightened after being broken) and is one of the hookshot founders.

Biography
In 1934 he graduated Marquette University. Played for college stars team (Marquette University team). In 1938 he arrived to Lithuania and competed for Lithuania national basketball team during EuroBasket 1939. During EuroBasket 1939 he scored 73 points combined.

Later he returned to United States and worked as a coach and school sports director (1940–1959).

In 2007 he was named fourth during the most famous Lithuanian basketball player election.

References

Sources
Stanislovas Stonkus, Vytautas Budriūnas - Visuotinė lietuvių enciklopedija, T. III (Beketeriai-Chakasai). – Vilnius: Science and encyclopedia publishing institute, 2003, page 563
Vidas Mačiulis, Vytautas Gudelis. Halė, kurioje žaidė Lubinas ir Sabonis. 1939–1989 – Respublikinis sporto kombinatas, Kaunas, 1989

1908 births
2003 deaths
FIBA EuroBasket-winning players
Lithuanian men's basketball players
Marquette Golden Eagles men's basketball players
Lithuanian emigrants to the United States